Steal Yer Heart is an album released by The Briefs on October 18, 2005. It was the first album recorded with Kicks on bass.

Track listing
Genital General
Criminal Youth
Move Too Slow
Lint Fabrik
Getting Hit on at the Bank
Stuck on You
I Can't Work
Can't Get Through
My Girl (Wants to Be a Zombie)
Normal Jerks
Forty and Above
Razorblade Heart

External links

References 

2005 albums
The Briefs albums
BYO Records albums